Burguillos del Cerro is a municipality in the province of Badajoz, Extremadura, Spain. It has a population of 3,284 and an area of 187.5 km².

References

Municipalities in the Province of Badajoz